Reggina Calcio made its Serie A debut in the 1999-00 season, ending the season in twelfth place for the southernmost team in the league at the time. The season also saw the definite breakthroughs of Roberto Baronio, Andrea Pirlo, and Mohamed Kallon, leading to all three players joining larger clubs in the summer. The performance also owed much to goalkeeper Massimo Taibi, returning from a poor spell at Manchester United.

Squad

Goalkeepers
  Massimo Taibi
  Antonio Castelli
  Emanuele Belardi

Defenders
  Jorge Vargas
  Bruno Cirillo
  Maurizio Poli
  Giovanni Morabito
  Simone Giacchetta
  Wladmiro Sbaglia
  Paolo Foglio
  Joseph Dayo Oshadogan
  Lorenzo Stovini

Midfielders
  Roberto Baronio
  Francesco Cozza
  Giandomenico Mesto
  Salvatore Vicari
  Ezio Brevi
  Andrea Bernini
  Riccardo Marroccolo
  Serge Dié
  Nenad Pralija
  Andrea Pirlo

Attackers
  Mohamed Kallon
  Alessandro Iannuzzi
  Davide Possanzini
  Erjon Bogdani
  Gustavo Reggi

Serie A

Matches

Coppa Italia

First round

Second round

Topscorers
  Mohamed Kallon 11
  Andrea Pirlo 6
  Davide Possanzini 3
  Roberto Baronio 3

References

Sources
  RSSSF - Italy 1999/00

Reggina 1914 seasons
Reggina